Stefano Napolitano (born 11 April 1995) is an Italian professional tennis player playing on the ATP Challenger Tour. On 12 June 2017, he reached his highest ATP singles ranking of 152 and his highest doubles ranking of 182 was achieved on 3 April 2017.

Napolitano defeated Augusto Virgili in the qualifying of 2015 Distal & ITR Group Tennis Cup 6–0, 6–3, winning the first set without dropping a single point, which is referred to as a golden set.

Challenger and Futures finals

Singles: 13 (2–11)

Doubles: 10 (4–6)

Singles performance timeline

Junior Grand Slam finals

Doubles: 1 (1 runner-up)

References

External links
 
 

1995 births
Living people
Italian male tennis players
21st-century Italian people